Venterskroon is a town in Tlokwe Local Municipality in the North West province of South Africa. It is an old mining town, located in a valley in the middle of the Dome Mountain Land.

Venterskroon is home to the Vredefort Dome Information Centre. The Vredefort Dome is the center of the Vredefort impact structure. This impact structure is the world's largest, oldest, and most deeply eroded complex asteroid impact structure in the world, and has been listed by UNESCO as World Heritage Site 

Evidence of the earliest inhabitants of the Venterskroon area has been found at the farm Thabela Thabeng and consists of petroglyphs representing hippo and rhino

References

Populated places in the JB Marks Local Municipality